Knautia arvensis, commonly known as field scabious, is a herbaceous perennial species of flowering plant in the honeysuckle family Caprifoliaceae.

Description 

It prefers grassy places and dry soils, avoiding heavy soils, and flowers between July and September. The flowers are borne on inflorescences in the form of heads; each head contains many small florets. The head is flatter than in similar species, such as devil's bit scabious (Succisa pratensis) and small scabious (Scabiosa columbaria). There are 4 stamens in each floret, and 1 notched long stigma. The fruit is nut like, cylindrical and hairy,  in size. It has a tap root. The stem has long stiff hairs angled downwards. There are no stipules.

Ecology 
It is occasionally used by the marsh fritillary as a foodplant instead of its usual foodplant of devils bit scabious (Succisa pratensis).  It is also the foodplant of the narrow-bordered bee hawk-moth (Hemaris tityus).

Name
Species of scabious were used to treat scabies, and many other afflictions of the skin including sores caused by the bubonic plague. The word scabies comes from the Latin word scabere 'scratch'. Another name for this plant is gipsy rose.
The genus Knautia is named after a 17th-century German botanist, Christian Knaut.

Habitat
Commonly found on roadsides and field margins, and in meadows, it is particularly abundant where there is chalk bedrock.

Gallery

References

Taxa named by Carl Linnaeus
arvensis